Volutomitridae is a family of sea snails, marine gastropod mollusks, in the superfamily Turbinelloidea.

Distribution 
The highest diversity of Volutomitridae is found off the coast of New Caledonia.

Genera
The family Volutomitridae contains six genera and about fifty described recent species:
 Conomitra Conrad, 1865
 Magdalemitra Kilburn, 1974
 Microvoluta Angas, 1877
 Paradmete Strebel, 1908
 Peculator Iredale, 1924
 Volutomitra H. Adams and A. Adams, 1853

References

Further reading 
 Powell A. W. B., New Zealand Mollusca, William Collins Publishers Ltd, Auckland, New Zealand 1979 

 
Taxa named by John Edward Gray